Veronika Hubrtova is a Czech professional pool player. Hubrtova is most notable for reaching the last 32 stage of the 2009 WPA World Ten-ball Championship. Hubrtova is also a regular on the Euro Tour, having reached two semi-finals in 2019, at both the 2019 Austria Open and 2019 Veldhoven Open.

Hubrtova is a former European champion, winning the Nine-ball event in 2002, as well as reaching four finals.

References

External links

Female pool players
Czech pool players
Living people
Year of birth missing (living people)